Minkov is a surname. Notable people with this surname include:

 Aleksandr Vitalyevich Minkov (born 1957), Russian singer, songwriter, and musician
 Marin Minkov, also known as Maxim of Bulgaria (1914-2012), Bulgarian patriarch of the Bulgarian Orthodox Church from 1971 to 2012
 Mark Anatolievich Minkov (1944–2012), Soviet/Russian music composer
 Mihail Minkov (born 1993), Bulgarian professional footballer
 Nikola Minkov (born 1987), former Bulgarian footballer
 Nikolay Minkov (born 1997), Bulgarian footballer
 Svetoslav Konstantinov Minkov (1902–1966), Bulgarian absurdist fiction writer

Bulgarian-language surnames
Russian-language surnames